Oleksandr Viktorovych Babor is a retired Ukrainian professional footballer who played as a defender.

Career
Oleksandr Babor started his career in 1997 with Desna Chernihiv the main club of the city of Chernihiv. Here he played three seasons. In 2000 he moved to Ros Bila Tserkva where he managed to play 37 matches and scored 2 goals. In 2004 he moved to Desna Chernihiv where he won the 2005–06 Ukrainian Second League. He also played for Sokil Zolochiv, Dnipro Cherkasy and Mykolaiv. In 2009 he moved to Yednist-2 Plysky where he managed to win the Chernihiv Oblast Championship in 2009, 2010 and 2011, he also won the Chernihiv Oblast Cup in 2009 and 2010. In 2016 he moved to Frunzenets Nizhyn where he managed to win again the Chernihiv Oblast Championship and the Chernihiv Oblast Cup. After he played for Avanhard Koryukivka where he ended his career.

Outside of professional football
In March 2022 together with Artem Padun, Valentyn Krukovets, Volodymyr Chulanov they organized a charity tournament in Chernihiv Stadium to raise funds to reconstruct the house of Volodymyr Matsuta which was destroyed by the Russian troops during the Siege of Chernihiv.

Honours
Desna Chernihiv
 Ukrainian Second League: 2005–06

Yednist-2 Plysky
 Chernihiv Oblast Championship: 2009, 2010, 2011
 Chernihiv Oblast Cup: 2009, 2010

Frunzenets Nizhyn
 Chernihiv Oblast Championship: 2016
 Chernihiv Oblast Cup: 2016

References

1980 births
Living people
FC Desna Chernihiv players
FC Ros Bila Tserkva players
FC Sokil Zolochiv players
FC Dnipro Cherkasy players
MFC Mykolaiv players
FC Avanhard Koriukivka players
SDYuShOR Desna players
FC Yunist ShVSM managers
Ukrainian footballers
Ukrainian Premier League players
Ukrainian First League players
Ukrainian Second League players
Association football midfielders